Oscar Waldemar Tietgens (26 March 1879 – 28 July 1917) was a German rower who competed in the 1900 Summer Olympics. He was part of the German boat Germania Ruder Club, Hamburg, which won the gold medal in the coxed fours final B.

He was killed in action during World War I.

See also
 List of Olympians killed in World War I

References

External links

 

1879 births
1917 deaths
Olympic rowers of Germany
Rowers at the 1900 Summer Olympics
Olympic gold medalists for Germany
Olympic medalists in rowing
German male rowers
Medalists at the 1900 Summer Olympics
German military personnel killed in World War I
Rowers from Hamburg